The Slave is a 1917 American silent comedy film starring Billy West and featuring Oliver Hardy. It was unusual for a silent film in that, because it told its story so plainly, subtitles or intertitles were not considered necessary. It is not known whether the film currently survives.

Plot summary

Cast
 Billy West as Billy, the slave
 Oliver Hardy as The Sultan of Bacteria
 Leo White as The Vizier
 Bud Ross as Haratius Crabbe, the collector (credited as Budd Ross)
 Leatrice Joy as Susie, his daughter
 Gladys Varden as The Sultan's favorite
 Ethel Cassity
 Ellen Burford
 Martha Dean
 Ethelyn Gibson
 Joe Bordeaux

Reception
Like many American films of the time, The Slave was subject to cuts by city and state film censorship boards. For example, the Chicago Board of Censors required, in Reel 1, cuts of the entire incident of man throwing a lobster on a woman's back and all scenes of it on her back, the sultan poking man in back with dagger, and in Reel 2 the last two scenes of pulling the man through window where his trousers come off.

See also
 List of American films of 1917
 Oliver Hardy filmography

References

External links
 
 

1917 films
1917 comedy films
1917 short films
Silent American comedy films
American silent short films
American black-and-white films
Films directed by Arvid E. Gillstrom
American comedy short films
1910s American films